is a Japanese long-distance runner. He competed in the senior men's race at the 2019 IAAF World Cross Country Championships held in Aarhus, Denmark. He finished in 80th place.

In 2017, he competed in the senior men's race at the IAAF World Cross Country Championships held in Kampala, Uganda. He finished in 73rd place. In 2018, he competed in the men's 3000 metres steeplechase event at the Asian Games held in Jakarta, Indonesia. He finished in 9th place.

In 2019, he competed in the men's 3000 metres steeplechase event at the Asian Athletics Championships held in Doha, Qatar. He finished in 6th place. In 2020, he won the gold medal in the men's 3000 metres steeplechase event at the 2020 Japan Championships in Athletics held in Niigata, Japan.

In 2021, he competed in the men's 3000 metres steeplechase event at the 2020 Summer Olympics held in Tokyo, Japan.

References

External links 
 

Living people
1991 births
Place of birth missing (living people)
Japanese male long-distance runners
Japanese male cross country runners
Japanese male steeplechase runners
Asian Games competitors for Japan
Athletes (track and field) at the 2018 Asian Games
Japan Championships in Athletics winners
Athletes (track and field) at the 2020 Summer Olympics
Olympic athletes of Japan
21st-century Japanese people